Gregorio Agós Muruzabal (8 June 1913 – 8 September 2001) was an Uruguayan basketball player. He competed in the 1936 Summer Olympics.

References

External links

1913 births
2001 deaths
Uruguayan men's basketball players
Olympic basketball players of Uruguay
Basketball players at the 1936 Summer Olympics